The 2020 Horizon League women's basketball tournament is the postseason women's basketball tournament for the Horizon League. It will be held March 3 through March 10, 2020. The winner, IUPUI, earned the conference's automatic berth into the 2020 NCAA women's tournament, but the tournament was cancelled due to the COVID-19 pandemic.

Seeds
All ten teams will participate in the tournament. Teams were seeded by record within the conference, with a tiebreaker system to seed teams with identical conference records.

Source:

Schedule

Source:

Bracket

References

Horizon League women's basketball tournament
Basketball competitions in Indianapolis
Women's sports in Indiana
2020s in Indianapolis
College sports tournaments in Indiana